Indiana Township is a township in Graham County, Kansas, USA.  As of the 2000 census, its population was 42.

Geography 
According to the USGS, it contains one cemetery, South Star.

References
 USGS Geographic Names Information System (GNIS)

External links
 US-Counties.com
 City-Data.com

Townships in Graham County, Kansas
Townships in Kansas